The National People's Union (NZL) was a political party in Poland.

History
The party was established in July 1919 by former members of the Polish United Party and the Popular National Union. It formed part of the Polish Centre alliance for the 1922 elections, in which the alliance won six seats.

In August 1923 it merged into one of the peasant parties.

References

Defunct political parties in Poland
Political parties established in 1919
Political parties disestablished in 1923
1919 establishments in Poland
Agrarian parties in Poland